Statistics of UAE Football League in season 1985/86.

Overview
It was contested by 10 teams, and Al-Nasr Sports Club won the championship.

League standings

References
United Arab Emirates - List of final tables (RSSSF)

UAE Pro League seasons
United
1985–86 in Emirati football